Josh Parker is an American entrepreneur best known for his innovative development of maple products, and is the founder of Parker's Real Maple, which has been sold at over 500 retail locations.  He has been featured on Shark Tank, the Glenn Beck Program, and Fox News, among others. At the age of thirteen, Parker was the youngest maple syrup developer in New York state.

History
Parker went on a school field trip to a maple farm in 2009 at 11 years old and was intrigued by the fact that one could tap a tree in their own front yard and produce maple syrup.  He boiled maple syrup on his mother's stove but was limited to only producing a couple of gallons a year. His grandparents bought him a small boiler where he was able to produce 15 gallons a year.  At fifteen years old, his father co-signed a business loan which allowed Parker to convert a large barn on the family's farm into a sugar shack.  His stainless-steel industrial size evaporator was the first to be powered by wood pellets in New York.

"With the 15 buckets, I then went to 30 buckets and then, from the 30 buckets to 60 buckets. Then, finally, I did 100 buckets for a couple of seasons... Now I finally went to about 3,500 taps this season" said Parker, in an interview with Fox News.

In June 2015, Parker appeared on the Glenn Beck Program as Beck was interested in his entrepreneurial efforts.  The interview had a positive impact on Parker's Maple and by the end of 2015, Parker’s Maple was available in many retail locations. Beck invited Parker back for an interview on his radio show on October 6, 2016, and six months later Parker’s Maple products could be found in over 500 stores in 50 states and four countries.

In 2016, Parker pitched his products to a panel of potential investors on Shark Tank.  Within the following week, Parker said that he had reached over a quarter-of-a-million dollars in sales. Parker's products have been sold at Costco and Walmart, among others. 
 
In 2020, Parker sold Parker's Real Maple to The Forest Farmers for an undisclosed amount where production still continues. In 2021, Parker's Real Maple products was still being sold in retail locations and was reviewed by Delish Food News and voted one of their favorite maple syrups.

Early life
Josh Parker was born (January 8, 1998) to parents Christian and Jennifer Parker.  His father is a contractor and musician and his mother is a public high school guidance counselor. His grandfather, Arlie Parker, is a Canadian retired ice hockey defenseman.

Parker was interviewed by NCPR and when the segment aired, Erin Draper reached out to Parker, asking him if he would be interested in enrolling Clarkson's entrepreneurial program. Parker enrolled at Clarkson’s, completing his senior year in freshman-level college courses.  Draper mentored Parker on shipments, hiring employees and remodeling his facility.

References

1998 births
21st-century American businesspeople
Living people